The Temple of Ellesyia is an ancient Egyptian rock-cut temple originally located near the site of Qasr Ibrim. It was built during the 18th Dynasty by the Pharaoh Thutmosis III. The temple was dedicated to the deities Amun, Horus and Satis.

During the International Campaign to Save the Monuments of Nubia, the Nubian monument salvage campaign guided by the UNESCO in the 1960s, the temple was moved to the Museo Egizio at Turin in order to save it from being submerged by Lake Nasser.

See also 
The four temples donated to countries assisting the relocation are:
 Temple of Debod (Madrid, Spain)
 Temple of Dendur (Metropolitan Museum of Art, New York, United States)
 Temple of Taffeh  (Rijksmuseum van Oudheden in Leiden, the Netherlands)
 Temple of Ellesyia (Museo Egizio, Turin, Italy)

Egyptian temples
International Campaign to Save the Monuments of Nubia
Museo Egizio